Orodo is an Igbo community in Mbaitoli local government area of Imo State, Nigeria. It is situated between Owerri city and Orlu town. Orodo has borders with Ogwa, Mbieri, Afara, Ifakala, Umuaka, Amurie Omanze and Amandugba. Also, the current Mbaitoli Local Government Headquarters is significantly located at a part of Orodo called Ofekata. The community said to have seven road junction,  in the center of the community called nkwo-orodo. The roads are: Ubaha-Eze road, Ahaba road, Amaukwu road, Umuonyahu road, Amaku road, Ofekata road and Eziama road.

References

Populated places in Imo State